Lokomotiv Stadium is a multi-purpose stadium in Mezdra, Bulgaria. It is currently used for football matches and it is the home of PFC Lokomotiv Mezdra. The stadium has a capacity of 5,000 spectators and it was built in 1946.
In 2007, when the football club was bought by NADIN AD, several renovations were made to the stadium, to meet the BFL's requirements, since Lokomotiv promoted to the A Group for the first time in the club’s history.
There were also plans for a new stadium in place of the current, but due to the global financial crisis, the project's realization is currently on hold.

References

Football venues in Bulgaria
Multi-purpose stadiums in Bulgaria
Mezdra
Buildings and structures in Vratsa Province